Angels & Kings was a nightclub in New York City, New York, located at 500 East 11th Street. The club was opened in 2007 by Fall Out Boy bassist Pete Wentz and Jamison Ernest of Yellow Fever, and is owned by several other musicians, including members of Gym Class Heroes, Cobra Starship, and The Academy Is.... It was also known as AK-47. Wentz has stated that he opened the bar in order for he and his friends to have a place to hang out.

Pete Wentz, Perez Hilton, and two business partners opened a second Angels & Kings in Chicago on June 17, 2008.  Since then, a third location had opened in Barcelona, and a fourth in Hollywood. In 2011, the Chicago location relocated to the Hard Rock Hotel in the Carbide & Carbon Building. In 2015, the Chicago location was closed.

History

Angels & Kings was opened on April 30, 2007, by bassist Pete Wentz and his fellow Fall Out Boy members with Jamison Ernest of Yellow Fever. Members of the bands Gym Class Heroes, Cobra Starship, and The Academy Is..., and employees of Crush Management, were also involved in the opening. The club was opened in the space that formerly housed the Orchid Lounge. The grand opening featured Wentz' then-girlfriend and former wife Ashlee Simpson and Tommy Hilfiger among others.

On May 29, 2009, Angels & Kings in New York was shut down by police after it received its third citation within a year of serving alcohol to minors. In April 2012, the New York location was closed down permanently.

Features

The one-room bar in New York featured framed mug shots of Johnny Cash, Jimi Hendrix, Sid Vicious, Lil' Kim, and Frank Sinatra. Also mounted on the wall was a jukebox. The bar also hosted acoustic shows for entertainment.

References

External links
Club's official website

Nightclubs in Manhattan
Restaurants in Chicago
Drinking establishments in Chicago